Mark Wallace (born 1967) is an American businessman, former diplomat and lawyer.

Mark Wallace may also refer to:

Mark Wallace (community leader) (1893–1984), New Zealand cheesemaker, farmer, community leader and local politician
Mark Wallace (cricketer) (born 1981), Welsh cricketer
Mark Wallace (cyclist) (born 1995), Canadian mountain biker
Mark Wallace (journalist) (born 1984), British political journalist
Mark Wallace (businessman) (born 1953), CEO, Texas Children's Hospital
Mark I. Wallace, American professor of religion